Športni park is a name for many stadiums in Slovenia. It can refer to:
Domžale Sports Park
Nova Gorica Sports Park
Lendava Sports Park
Kodeljevo Sports Park
Kidričevo Sports Park